Workers & Resources: Soviet Republic is a 2019 city-building and construction and management simulation developed and released by the Slovak game studio 3Division.

Gameplay 
Players engage in urban and industrial planning of various levels of complexity. Players can choose to enable or disable heating and electricity requirements for buildings, fuel requirements for vehicles, and a complex educational system (parents cannot work without a school for young children). Construction is accomplished quickly via money or more realistically through the use of construction offices and acquired resources. Produced goods can be sold to the Warsaw Pact (generally) or the West, or put to use in the republic.

Development and release 
Workers & Resources: Soviet Republic was developed based on the previous success of other similar games in the genre, including Cities: Skylines and Transport Fever. However unlike previous games, the focus of Workers & Resources: Soviet Republic was to simulate the economic systems of communist states during the Cold War era, with the game being set between the 1960s and the 1990s, though there is no ending time limit. 

The game was first released in early access on Steam on 15 March 2019.

In February 2023 the game was removed from Steam due to a DMCA takedown issued by a content creator over the rights to a realistic mode that the fan had conceived, which 3Division had planned to incorporate with credit in a later release of the game. Fortunately, the legal issue was resolved and the game was brought back to Steam in March 2023.

Reception 
Workers & Resources received mostly positive reviews from both critics and players during early access, though some criticized the game's lack of tutorials in the early stages.

See also 
 List of city-building video games
 List of video games developed in Slovakia

References

External links 
 Workers & Resources: Soviet Republic Website
 Workers & Resources: Soviet Republic on Steam

2019 video games
City-building games
Early access video games
Video games set in the Soviet Union
Video games developed in Slovakia
Windows games
Windows-only games